North Huish is a village, civil parish, former ecclesiastical parish and former manor in the South Hams district of Devon, England. Avonwick is the largest village in the parish, Avonwick was only named that in 1870 and parts were previously part of different parishes until the late 20th century. The parish had a population of 360 in the 2001 census.

St Mary's Church
St Mary's Church, the parish church built in the 14th century, is now a redundant church in the care of the Churches Conservation Trust.  It was declared redundant on 1 March 1993, and was vested in the Trust on 10 August 1998.

Manor
During the reign of King Richard I (1189-1199) the manor was held by John Damarell (Latinized to de Albamara), whose male descendants held it for many generations. It then passed to the Trenchard family and thence to Tremain (alias Tremayn) of Collacombe.

Historic estates
Within the parish are situated various historic estates including:
Boterford.
Black Hall, a seat of a junior branch of the Fowell family of nearby Fowelscombe in the parish of Ugborough.

References

External sources

Villages in South Hams
Civil parishes in South Hams